Easter Island and Robinson Crusoe Island require their residents to register their motor vehicles and display vehicle registration plates. Both had plates with the provincial name (I. de Pascua for Isla de Pascua and J. Fernández for Juan Fernández Islands) until 1984. Since 1984, plates are Chilean standard plates without the provincial name.

References

Easter Island
Easter Island
Easter Island-related lists